Caribachlamys ornata , the ornate scallop, is a species of bivalve mollusc in the family Pectinidae. It can be found in Caribbean waters, ranging from southern Florida to the West Indies and Brazil.

References

Pectinidae
Bivalves described in 1819
Fauna of the Caribbean
Fauna of the Dominican Republic
Taxa named by Jean-Baptiste Lamarck